Sterling Belmont "Bozo" Bose (September 23, 1906, born in Florence, Alabama – July 23, 1958) was an American jazz trumpeter and cornetist who also marked a twice occurrence of double instrumentation, with a 1935-1938 Glenn Miller trumpet-violin and then a trombone with a 1937-1947 various album. His style was heavily influenced by Bix Beiderbecke and changed little over the course of his life.

Bose's early experience came with Dixieland jazz bands in his native Alabama before moving to St. Louis, Missouri in 1923. He played with the Crescent City Jazzers and the Arcadian Serenaders, and with Jean Goldkette's Orchestra in 1927 until 1928, after the departure of Beiderbecke. Following this he worked in the house band at radio station WGN in Chicago before joining Ben Pollack from 1930 to 1933. He also worked with Eddie Sheasby in Chicago, and moved to New York City in 1933. He had many gigs in New York in the 1930s and 1940s, including time with Joe Haymes (1934–35) and Tommy Dorsey (1935), Ray Noble (1936), Benny Goodman (1936), Lana Webster, Glenn Miller (1937), Bob Crosby (1937–39), Bobby Hackett (1939), Bob Zurke, Jack Teagarden, Bud Freeman (1942), George Brunies, Bobby Sherwood (1943), Miff Mole, Art Hodes, Horace Heidt (1944), and Tiny Hill (1946). Following this he did some further freelancing in Chicago and New York, and then moved to Florida in 1948, setting up his own bands there.

Bose suffered from an extended period of illness in the 1950s, and eventually committed suicide in July 1958 in St. Petersburg, Florida.

References
Footnotes

General references
Scott Yanow, [ Sterling Bose] at AllMusic

External links
Pete Kelly's blog

1906 births
1958 deaths
Musicians from Florence, Alabama
American jazz trumpeters
American male trumpeters
American jazz cornetists
20th-century American musicians
20th-century trumpeters
Jazz musicians from Alabama
20th-century American male musicians
American male jazz musicians
Suicides by firearm in Florida